The 1987–88 Albanian National Championship was the 49th season of the Albanian National Championship, the top professional league for association football clubs, since its establishment in 1930.

Overview
It was contested by 14 teams, and 17 Nëntori won the championship.

First phase

League table 

Note 1: After the regular season, Tomori and 31 Korriku were relegated immediately, while the other 12 teams were divided in 2 groups in the final phase

Results

Final phase

Championship round

Results

Relegation round

Note 2: '17 Nëntori' is Tirana, 'Labinoti' is Elbasani, 'Lokomotiva Durrës' is Teuta

Results

Promotion/relegation playoffs and Qyteti Stalin riots
Naftëtari Qyteti Stalin qualified for a promotion/relegation playoff after finishing runners-up to second tier champions Traktori Lushnja. After losing the first match 1–0 away to Albanian giants and Ministry of Interior club Dinamo Tirana, the second match in Qyteti Stalin on 5 June 1988 ended in riots and burning of the Dinamo team bus partly due to the fact that the game was led by a referee and assistants from Tirana. Dinamo also won the second leg 1-0- and the subsequent riots led to the suspension of Naftëtari from playing football for a year and demotion to the third tier. Their coach Pandi Angjeli and players Meta and Makashi were suspended for life and club manager Fatmir Ismaili was dismissed.

Season statistics

Top scorers

References

External links
Albania - List of final tables (RSSSF)

Kategoria Superiore seasons
1
Albanian Superliga